Alexander Harkavy (Aleksandr Garkavi; May 5, 1863 at Nowogrudok, Minsk guberniya (governorate), Russian Empire (now Navahrudak, Hrodna Voblast, Belarus) - 1939 in New York City) was a Russian-born American writer, lexicographer and linguist.

Biography

Alexander Harkavy was educated privately, and at an early age evinced a predilection for philology. In 1879 he went to Vilna, where he worked in the printing-office of the Romm Brothers.

After the antisemitic pogroms of 1880 in Russia, Harkavy joined the Jewish Am Olam (Eternal People) back-to-the-land movement. Unlike Bilu, which directed its activities towards Palestine, Am Olam saw a Jewish future in the United States. In 1882 Harkavy emigrated to the United States. He however did not succeed in joining or establishing an agricultural Am Olam entity, finding himself in search of a living.

He was in Paris in 1885, New York in 1886, Montreal in 1887, Baltimore in 1889 and back in New York in 1890. During these years of wandering Harkavy studied, taught, and published his first journalistic and scholarly compositions. In Montreal he achieved some acclaim among local Hebraists,  and founded a branch of Chovevei Zion, of which he served as president.

Harkavy published in lithograph form one issue of a Yiddish newspaper, Die Tzeit (The Time), the first Jewish newspaper in Canada. He also wrote the first history of the Jews in Canada.  Back in the United States he participated in the activities of the anarchist group Pionire der Frayhayt (Pioneers of Liberty). In Baltimore he published Der Idisher Progres (Jewish Progress) in 1890. He was one of the contributors to the Jewish Encyclopedia.

Harkavy also worked on translating Scripture into English, starting with Genesis (published 1915), then Psalms (1915), then The Twenty-Four Books of the Holy Scriptures According to the Masoretic Text (1916), with reprintings following.

Work on Yiddish
It is partly due to Harkavy's work that Yiddish today is regarded as a language. His Yiddish dictionaries show that its vocabulary is as ample as that of the average modern language, and that, if lacking in technical terms, it is richer in idiomatic and characteristic expressions.

Works
Among Alexander Harkavy's most important works are:
 Alexander Harkavy, The Jews in Canada, Montreal 1887; reprinted in: Canadian Jewish Historical Society - Journal Vol. 7 no 2, S. 59-61 
 "Complete English-Jewish Dictionary" (1891);
 "Dictionary of the Yiddish Language: Yiddish-English" (1898);
 pocket editions of English-Jewish and Jewish-English dictionaries;
 "Amerikanischer Briefsteller" (English and Judæo-German, 1899);
 "Ollendorf's Method of English: in Yiddish" (1893);
 "Uchebnik Angliskavo Yazyka" (1892);
 "Torat Leshon Anglit", an English grammar in Hebrew (1894);
 "Ha-Yesh Mishpaṭ Lashon li-Sefat Yehudit?" (1896), in which he shows that Yiddish has the essential elements and forms of a living language;
 "Don Kichot", a Judæo-German translation (1897–98);
 Yiddish-English (6th edition), English-Yiddish (11th edition) Dictionary (1910);
  The Holy Scriptures (1916) reprinted 1936 & 1951;
 Yiddish-English-Hebrew Dictionary (4th ed 1928) republished 1968.
 "Students' Hebrew and Chaldee Dictionary to the Old Testament" (1914)

Bibliography of Jewish Encyclopedia
 E. Harkavy, Dor Yesharim, New York, 1992 
 Benzion Eisenstadt, Ḥakme Yisrael be-Ameriḳa, New York, 1903, p. 33 
 Ha-Leom (Harkavy's autobiography), vol. ii., New York, 1903
 Kenyon Zimmer,  "'The Whole World is Our Country': Immigration and Anarchism in the United States, 1885-1940" (dissertation), University of Pittsburgh 2010, p. 78-81. 
Jonathan D. Sarna, "Our Distant Brethren" - Alexander Harkavy On Montreal Jews - 1888 (engl.), in: Canadian Jewish Historical Society - Journal Vol. 7 no 2, S. 59-61

References
 
 Alexander Harkavy in Jewish Encyclopedia on the Web (Russian)
  Scan of Frontispiece of the 1898 Pocket Edition of Harkavy's Jewish-English Dictionary

See also
 YIVO

1863 births
1939 deaths
People from Navahrudak
People from Novogrudsky Uyezd
Belarusian Jews
Emigrants from the Russian Empire to the United States
American people of Belarusian-Jewish descent
Jewish American writers
American lexicographers
Linguists from the United States
Linguists of Yiddish
American encyclopedists
Contributors to the Jewish Encyclopedia
History of YIVO
Translators of the Bible into English
Jewish translators of the Bible
Hovevei Zion